County Route 530 (CR 530) is a county highway in the U.S. state of New Jersey. The highway extends 31.21 miles (50.23 kilometers) from US 206 and Route 38 in Southampton Township to Water Street (Route 166) in Toms River Township.

Route description

CR 530 begins at an intersection with US 206 in Southampton Township, Burlington County, heading east on four-lane undivided Pemberton Road. West of US 206, the road becomes Route 38. From here, the route passes woods and farms with some homes and businesses. The road crosses into Pemberton Township before continuing into Pemberton, at which point CR 530 becomes Hampton Street. Upon crossing CR 616, the route becomes the two-lane Pemberton By-Pass and intersects CR 644, heading southeast into forested areas and crossing back into Pemberton Township. The road turns north and joins CR 687, crossing the Rancocas Creek. The bypass ends at Pemberton-Browns Mills Road, at which point CR 687 turns west and CR 530 continues to the east. The route heads through agricultural areas with some development, coming to a junction with CR 646. From here, the road enters forested areas of the Pine Barrens  with a few homes before turning northeast and reaching the community of Browns Mills. In this area, CR 530 passes businesses and makes a turn to the southeast at a junction with CR 667 and CR 669. The road comes to the southern terminus of CR 545, with the name becoming Lakehurst Road, and passes Mirror Lake. After the CR 645 junction, CR 530 passes more rural areas of homes, with the road curving more to the east. After passing some cranberry bogs, CR 530 meets Route 70 and heads east concurrent with that route.

A short distance later, the two routes enter Manchester Township in Ocean County and continue east through a tract of the Brendan T. Byrne State Forest within the Pine Barrens as well as a corner of the Fort Dix Military Reservation. The road eventually reaches the community of Whiting, where it passes commercial development at the intersection with CR 539. Here, CR 530 turns south to follow CR 539 on Allentown-Whiting Road, splitting from that route a short distance later by turning east onto Lacey Road. The road heads into a mix of forests and residential subdivisions, crossing a New Jersey Seashore Lines railroad line before intersecting CR 615 and CR 614. At the intersection with the latter, CR 530 becomes Keswick Road and passes near more developed areas before entering more rural areas of the Pine Barrens and turning southeast. The road enters Berkeley Township, intersecting CR 39 before reaching the CR 618 junction. At this junction, CR 530 turns northeast onto Dover Road and continues for a distance before coming into South Toms River. At this point, the road enters residential areas and intersects CR 619 prior to coming to an interchange with the Garden State Parkway/US 9. Here, CR 530 has access to and from the northbound direction of the Garden State Parkway/US 9 and crosses the northbound direction of US 9 at an at-grade intersection and has a brief concurrency with southbound US 9 from the point it exits the Garden State Parkway. A short distance later, the route makes a turn north onto South Main Street and passes between the Toms River to the west and woods to the east. CR 530 enters industrial areas before reaching its eastern terminus at the Route 166 intersection.

Major intersections

See also

References

External links 

NJ State Highways: CR 515-530

530
530
530